Unstoppable is DeLon's second album. DeLon embarked on a 60-school tour of middle schools, high schools and colleges in his "Unity Through Education Tour" in Los Angeles.

Track listing

2008 albums